A deformity, dysmorphism, or dysmorphic feature is a major abnormality of an organism that makes a part of the body appear or function differently than how it is supposed to.

Causes
Deformity can be caused by a variety of factors:
Arthritis and other rheumatoid disorders
Chronic application of external forces, e.g. artificial cranial deformation
Chronic paresis, paralysis or muscle imbalance, especially in children, e.g. due to poliomyelitis or cerebral palsy
Complications at birth
Damage to the fetus or uterus
Fractured bones left to heal without being properly set (malunion)
Genetic mutation
Growth or hormone disorders
Infection
Reconstructive surgery following a severe injury, e.g. burn injury

Deformity can occur in all organisms:

 Frogs can be mutated due to Ribeiroia (Trematoda) infection.
 Plants can undergo irreversible cell deformation
 Insects, such as honeybees, can be affected by deformed wing virus
 Fish can be found with scoliosis due to environmental factors

Mortality

In many cases where a major deformity is present at birth, it is the result of an underlying condition severe enough that the baby does not survive very long. The mortality of severely deformed births may be due to a range of complications including missing or non-functioning vital organs, structural defects that prevent necessary function, high susceptibility to injuries, abnormal facial appearance, or infections that eventually lead to death.

In some cases, such as that of twins, one fetus is brought to term healthy, while the other faces major, even life-threatening defects. An example of this is seen in cattle, referred to as amorphous globosus.

In Mythology
There are many instances of Mythological characters showing signs of a deformity.

 Descriptions of mermaids may be related to the symptoms of Sirenomelia.
 The Irish Mythology includes the Fomorians, who are almost without exception described as being deformed, possessing only one of what most have two of (eyes, arms, legs, etc.) or having larger than normal limbs.
 Hephaestus, of Greek Mythology, was born with a club foot.

See also 

Birth defect
Body dysmorphic disorder
Congenital abnormality
Disfigurement 
Genetic variation 
Malformation 
Monstrous birth 
Phocomelia 
Polymelia
Teratology

References

Further reading 

 

Human appearance
Biology